Duck Creek Lutheran Church and Cemetery is a historic church located outside of  Lodgepole in rural Perkins County, South Dakota.
The church was added to the National Register in 1987. It was built during 1900 of wood-frame construction in rural Carpenter Gothic style.

References

External links
 
 
 
 

Lutheran churches in South Dakota
Churches on the National Register of Historic Places in South Dakota
Gothic Revival church buildings in South Dakota
Churches completed in 1900
Churches in Perkins County, South Dakota
National Register of Historic Places in Perkins County, South Dakota
Lutheran cemeteries in the United States